Caloptilia pallescens is a moth of the family Gracillariidae. It is known from Turkey.

References

pallescens
Endemic fauna of Turkey
Moths described in 1880
Moths of Asia